Boady Santavy (born May 22, 1997) is a Canadian weightlifter from Sarnia, Ontario.

Personal life
Santavy's father, Dalas competed at the 2005 World Weightlifting Championships, while his grandfather Bob, represented the country at the 1968 and 1976 Summer Olympics in Mexico City and Montreal respectively. Santavy's grandfather also won a bronze at the 1975 Pan American Games in Mexico City. Santavy's younger brother Noah is also a weightlifter.

On Sunday, March 18, 2018, Santavy struck and seriously injured a Sarnia, Ontario man, then fled the scene. The victim suffered a broken shoulder blade, clavicle, lacerated spleen, brain bleed and other superficial wounds.  He turned himself in to police the following day.

Career

2015 Pan American Games
Santavy made his international senior debut at the 2015 Pan American Games held in Toronto, Canada. At the games Santavy competed in the 85 kg event and finished in 6th (and last) place with a total of 322 kg. Santavy snatched 146 kg and clean and jerked 176 kg.

2017 World Weightlifting Championships
Santavy moved up to compete in the 94 kg event at the 2017 World Weightlifting Championships held in Anaheim, California. Santavy finished in sixth place with an overall lift of 366 kg.

2018 Commonwealth Games
Santavy qualified to compete at the 2018 Commonwealth Games to be held in the Gold Coast, Australia. Santavy qualified as the number one ranked athlete in the 94 kg event. Santavy unofficially broke the Commonwealth record in the 94 kg event in training in March 2018, weeks before the games.

2020 Olympics
In June 2021, Santavy was named to Canada's Olympic team.

References

External links 

1997 births
Living people
Canadian male weightlifters
Sportspeople from Sarnia
Weightlifters at the 2018 Commonwealth Games
Weightlifters at the 2015 Pan American Games
Weightlifters at the 2019 Pan American Games
Commonwealth Games medallists in weightlifting
Commonwealth Games silver medallists for Canada
Pan American Games medalists in weightlifting
Pan American Games silver medalists for Canada
Medalists at the 2019 Pan American Games
Pan American Weightlifting Championships medalists
Weightlifters at the 2020 Summer Olympics
Olympic weightlifters of Canada
21st-century Canadian people
Medallists at the 2018 Commonwealth Games